In mathematics, Laguerre transform is an integral transform named after the mathematician Edmond Laguerre, which uses generalized Laguerre polynomials  as kernels of the transform.

The Laguerre transform of a function  is

The inverse Laguerre transform is given by

Some Laguerre transform pairs

References

Integral transforms
Mathematical physics